The Best of Bowie is a compilation album by English singer-songwriter David Bowie, released in 1980 by K-tel. The cover was based on the 12-inch single sleeve design of Bowie's "Fashion". It made No. 3 in the UK Albums Chart.

In addition to including the rare 7" edits of "Fame" and "Golden Years", the compilation contains unique edits of "Life on Mars?" and "Diamond Dogs", ostensibly to allow all 16 tracks to fit on one LP. Early copies of the LP had a sticker on the back cover showing the track listing. If the sticker was removed, the original track listing could be seen, showing "Drive-In Saturday" (from Aladdin Sane, 1973) as track 7 in place of the live version of "Breaking Glass", which explains the latter's appearance out of chronological sequence here.

Track listing
All songs written by David Bowie, except where noted.

Side one
"Space Oddity" – 5:07
"Life on Mars?" (K-tel edit) – 3:34
"Starman" – 4:07
"Rock 'n' Roll Suicide" – 2:56
"John, I'm Only Dancing" (Sax version) – 2:37
"The Jean Genie" – 4:03
"Breaking Glass" (Live from Stage) (Bowie, Dennis Davis, George Murray) – 3:27
"Sorrow" (Bob Feldman, Jerry Goldstein, Richard Gottehrer) – 2:51

Side two
"Diamond Dogs" (K-tel edit) – 4:36
"Young Americans" – 5:05
"Fame" (Edit) (Bowie, John Lennon, Carlos Alomar) – 3:25
"Golden Years" (Edit) – 3:20
"TVC 15" (Edit) – 3:28
"Sound and Vision" – 3:00
""Heroes"" (Edit) (Bowie, Brian Eno) – 3:26
"Boys Keep Swinging" (Bowie, Eno) – 3:15

Charts

References

David Bowie compilation albums
1980 greatest hits albums
Albums produced by Gus Dudgeon
Albums produced by David Bowie
Albums produced by Tony Visconti
Albums produced by Ken Scott
K-tel compilation albums